Jared Mills (born 11 February 1975) is a New Zealand former professional rugby league footballer who represented Aotearoa Māori in the 2000 World Cup.

Playing career
Mills played 22 first grade games for the Western Suburbs Magpies in 1998 and 1999. In 2000 he played for the Newtown Jets.

Mills first played for the New Zealand Māori in their one off match against Great Britain in 1999. He was then named part of the Aotearoa Māori squad for the 2000 World Cup, where he played in one match.

References

1975 births
Living people
New Zealand rugby league players
New Zealand Māori rugby league players
New Zealand Māori rugby league team players
Newtown Jets NSW Cup players
Rugby league players from Northland Region
Rugby league wingers
Western Suburbs Magpies players